Dr. Pyckle and Mr. Pryde is a 1925 American silent, black-and-white comedy film, directed by Scott Pembroke and Joe Rock (also the producer).

The film itself is both a spoof of the previous Dr. Jekyll and Mr. Hyde films (e.g. Dr. Jekyll and Mr. Hyde (1912) and Dr. Jekyll and Mr. Hyde (1920)) and the well-famed 1886 novella by Robert Louis Stevenson Strange Case of Dr Jekyll and Mr Hyde. The film stars Stan Laurel as the title characters.

Plot and Characters
Dr. Stanislaus Pyckle, (a play of the actor's name, Stan Laurel), successfully separates the good and evil of man's nature with the use of a powerful drug -- "Dr. Pyckle's 58th Variety", a spoof of "Heinz's 57". Transforming into the personality of Mr. Pryde (again Laurel), he terrorizes the town with unspeakable acts including stealing a boy's ice cream, cheating at marbles, and popping a bag behind a lady pedestrian. The townspeople track him down where Mr. Pride locks himself in the laboratory and transforms back as Dr. Pyckle. The doctor assures the townspeople that he hasn't seen the "fiend" they were after. While he talks, the drug used for the transformation spills in the plate of food of the doctor's dog. Dr. Pyckle confronts the fiendish dog when he locks the door and the townspeople leave. But once again, Mr. Pride emerges and brings havoc to the town, and again is chased down by the townspeople. He enters the lab and transforms back into Pyckle, and again assures the townspeople he has not seen the fiend. His assistant (Julie Leonard) begs the doctor to open and comfort him, but he transforms back into Mr. Pride. He opens the door to the assistant and locks it again. She screams seeing Pride and the townspeople hurry back, before the assistant can knock Pride down.

The appearance of the fiendish Mr. Pride is an obvious spoof on the make-up designed for John Barrymore as Mr. Hyde. Also spoofed are the sudden and strange movements Barrymore's Jekyll makes during the transformation, as well as Hyde's confrontation with Millicent, Jekyll's fiancée, when Hyde lets her inside the lab. Other scenes show obvious parodies of other Dr. Jekyll and Mr. Hyde films (e.g. Dr. Jekyll and Mr. Hyde (1912) and the Haydon film from 1920).

Cast
 Stan Laurel as Dr. Pyckle / Mr. Pryde (sometimes as Mr. Pride)
 Julie Leonard as Dr. Pyckle's assistant
 Pete the Dog (as Pete the Pup)
 Syd Crossley (uncredited bit role) 
 Dot Farley (uncredited bit role)

Information
The following year (1926), Stan Laurel began his years-long collaboration with Oliver Hardy, and together they would make over 100 films. Pete the dog later starred in a series of Buster Brown films as Buster's dog Tige. The familiar circle around his eye was painted on by a makeup man.

Production
Directed by: Scott Pembroke and Joe Rock
Produced by: Joe Rock
Cinematography by: Edgar Lyons
Assistant Director: Murray Rock
Titles by: Tay Garnett
Company: Joe Rock Comedies

Additional details
Runtime: 21 minutes
Country: United States
Language: English
Color: Black-and-White
Sound Mix: Silent
Aspect Radio: 1.33 :1
Certification: UK:U

References

External links

 
 

1925 films
1920s parody films
1925 comedy films
1925 short films
American silent short films
American black-and-white films
American science fiction comedy films
American parody films
Films directed by Joe Rock
Films directed by Scott Pembroke
Dr. Jekyll and Mr. Hyde films
1920s American films
Silent American comedy films
Silent horror films